Plestsy Airport, also Pero is an airport in Russia located  east of Plesetsk.  It is a logistical base for the Plesetsk Cosmodrome launch facility.

The total cost of this work was $18.2 million.

The name comes from nearby Lake Plestsy. The closed town of Mirny is also situated in the area.

The airport is still in operation as a private airport and was never a main airport.

History 

In December 1958, the 156th separate mixed air squadron was formed at the Angara proving ground (now the Plesetsk cosmodrome), and in August 1966 it was reorganized into the 17th separate mixed air regiment.

Until the early 1990s, the airfield wore the code name "Feather". In some sources it is mentioned under the name “Plestsy” (after the name of a nearby lake), on the English-speaking maps it is designated as “Plestsy Airport”.

In 2004, the airfield was reconstructed: the light-signal and radio-technical equipment was replaced, strengthened and extended by 600 m runway, which allows the airfield to receive aircraft s Il-76, Tu-154 and lighter, as well as helicopters of all types. The maximum take-off weight of the aircraft is 200 tons.

Previously, An-26, An-30, An-72, An-12 airplanes and Mil Mi-8 helicopters from the structure of the former 17th separate mixed air regiment (military unit 32177) were based here. Then the 17th separate mixed air squadron (military unit 34185) was formed.

In January 2014, the 17th OSAE was liquidated along with one of the country's few technical maintenance units and redeployed to 33 OTSAP (Levashovo (air base)) in Vyborgsky district of St. Petersburg, which does not have such infrastructure. And at the airfield Plesetsk formed the aviation commandant's office, which is also part of 33 OTSAP. In August 2015, the aviation commandant's office of the Plesetsk airfield was reassigned to 7050 base of the Northern Fleet.

References

Airports built in the Soviet Union
Airports in Arkhangelsk Oblast